"Hard Day" is a song by English singer George Michael from his debut studio album, Faith (1987). It was released on 30 October 1987 as the album's third single. The song was written and originally produced by Michael, and was released solely in the United States and Australia. No music video was made for the song. The lyrics are apparently addressed to a woman which the singer is obsessed with; in the final verse, Michael voices her by altering his own voice, in the same style as Prince's imaginary alter ego Camille.

"Hard Day" reached the top five on the US Hot Dance Club Songs chart and the top 40 on the US Hot R&B/Hip-Hop Songs chart. The 12" single was backed with the extended mix of "I Want Your Sex". "Hard Day" was also released as the B-side of the earlier "I Want Your Sex" 12" single.

Track listings
US and Australian 12" single
A1. "Hard Day" (The Shep Pettibone Remix) – 8:31
A2. "Hard Day" (Radio Edit) – 4:11
B1. "I Want Your Sex" (Monogamy Mix) – 13:11

Charts

References

1987 singles
1987 songs
Columbia Records singles
Epic Records singles
George Michael songs
Songs written by George Michael
Song recordings produced by George Michael